This is a "genealogy" of programming languages. Languages are categorized under the ancestor language with the strongest influence. Those ancestor languages are listed in alphabetical order. Any such categorization has a large arbitrary element, since programming languages often incorporate major ideas from multiple sources.

ALGOL based
 ALGOL (also under Fortran)
 Atlas Autocode
 ALGOL 58 (IAL, International Algorithmic Language)
 MAD and GOM (Michigan Algorithm Decoder and Good Old MAD)
 ALGOL 60
 MAD/I
 Simula (see also Simula based languages)
 ALGOL 68
 ALGOL W
 Pascal
 Ada
 SPARK
 PL/SQL
 Turbo Pascal
 Object Pascal (Delphi)
 Free Pascal (FPC)
 Kylix (same as Delphi, but for Linux)
 Euclid
 Concurrent Euclid
 Turing
 Turing Plus
 Object Oriented Turing
 Mesa
 Modula-2
 Modula-3
 Oberon (Oberon-1)
 Go (also under C)
 Nim (also under Python)
 Oberon-2
 Component Pascal
 Active Oberon
 Zonnon
 Oberon-07
 Lua (also under Scheme and SNOBOL)
 Ring (also under C, BASIC, Ruby, Python, C#)
 SUE
 Plus
 CPL
 BCPL
 B
 C (see also C based languages)
 Julia (also under Lisp, Python, Ruby)

APL based
 APL
 A+
 J (also under FL)
 K (also under LISP)
 NESL
 PDL (also under Perl)

BASIC based
 BASIC (also under Fortran II)
 AmigaBASIC
 AMOS BASIC
 BASIC Stamp
 Basic-256
 BASIC09
 BBC Basic
 Blitz BASIC
 Blitz3D
 BlitzMax
 BlitzPlus
 Business Basic
 Caché Basic
 Chinese BASIC
 COMAL
 Commodore BASIC
 DarkBASIC
 DarkBASIC Professional
 Euphoria
 GLBasic
 GW-BASIC
 QuickBASIC
 QBasic
 Basic4GL
 FreeBASIC
 Liberty BASIC
 Run BASIC
 Visual Basic
 VBScript
 Visual Basic for Applications (VBA)
 LotusScript
 Visual Basic .NET
 Small Basic
B4X
 Basic for Qt
 OpenOffice Basic
 HBasic
 Gambas
 WinWrap Basic
 WordBasic
 QB64
 PureBasic
 REALbasic (Xojo)
 Ring (also under C, Ruby, Python, C#, Lua)
 thinBasic
 TI-BASIC
 True BASIC
 Turbo Basic
 PowerBASIC
 wxBasic
 SdlBasic
 XBasic
 YaBasic

Batch languages
 MS-DOS Batch files
 Winbatch
 CLIST
 IBM Job Control Language (JCL)

C based
 C (also under BCPL)
 Alef
 C++
 Rust (also under Cyclone, Haskell, and OCaml)
 D
 C#
 Windows PowerShell (also under DCL, ksh, and Perl)
 Ring (also under BASIC, Ruby, Python, Lua)
 Cobra (class/object model and other features)

 Java (see also Java based languages)
 C--
 Cyclone
 Rust (also under C++, Haskell, and OCaml)
 ColdFusion
 Go (also under Oberon)
 Harbour
 Limbo
 LPC
 Pike
 Objective-C (also under Smalltalk)
 Swift (also under Ruby, Python, and Haskell)
 PCASTL (also under Lisp)
 Perl
 Windows PowerShell (also under C#, DCL, and ksh)
 S2
 PHP
 Ruby (also under Smalltalk)
 Julia (also under Lisp, Python, ALGOL)
 Ring (also under C, BASIC, Python, C#, Lua)
 Swift (also under Objective-C, Python, and Haskell)
 Crystal
Elixir (also under Erlang)
 PDL (also under APL)
 Raku
 Python
 Julia (also under Lisp, Ruby, ALGOL)
 Nim (also under Oberon)
 Ring (also under C, BASIC, Ruby, C#, Lua)
 Swift (also under Ruby, Objective-C, and Haskell)
 QuakeC
 Ring (also under BASIC, Ruby, Python, C#, Lua) 
 tcsh (also under sh)

C# based
 C# 
 Chapel
 Clojure
 Crystal
 D
 J#
 Dart
 F#
 Hack
 Java
 Kotlin
 Nemerle
 Oxygene
 Ring
 Rust
 Swift
 Vala
 TypeScript

COBOL based
 COBOL
 ABAP
 DIBOL
 WATBOL

COMIT based
 COMIT
 SNOBOL
 Icon
 Unicon
 Lua (also under Modula and Scheme)
 Ring (also under C, BASIC, Ruby, Python, C#)

DCL based
 DCL
 Windows PowerShell (also under C#, ksh, and Perl)

ed based
 ed (programming language)
 sed
 AWK
 Perl (also under C)

Eiffel based
 Eiffel
 Cobra (design by contract)
 Sather
 Ubercode

Forth based
 Forth
 InterPress
 PostScript
 Joy
 Factor
 Rebol (also under Lisp)
 RPL (also under Lisp)

Fortran based
 Fortran
 Fortran II
 BASIC (see also BASIC based languages)
 Fortran IV
 WATFOR
 WATFIV
 Fortran 66
 FORMAC
 Ratfor
 Fortran 77
 WATFOR-77
 Ratfiv
 Fortran 90
 Fortran 95
 F
 Fortran 2003
 Fortran 2008
 Fortran 2018

 ALGOL (see also ALGOL based languages)

FP based
 FP (Function Programming)
 FL (Function Level)
 J (also under APL)
 FPr (also under Lisp and object-oriented programming)

HyperTalk based
 HyperTalk
 ActionScript (also under JavaScript)
 AppleScript
 SenseTalk
 SuperTalk
 Transcript

Java based
 Java (also under C)
 Ateji PX
 C#
 Ceylon
 Fantom
 Apache Groovy
 OptimJ
 Processing
 Scala
 Join Java
 J#
 Kotlin
 X10

JavaScript based
 JavaScript (also under Scheme, Self) 
 ActionScript (also under HyperTalk)
 Haxe
 Asm.js
 CoffeeScript
 ECMAScript 
 JavaScript OSA
 JScript 
 TypeScript

JOSS based
 JOSS
 CAL
 TELCOMP
 FOCAL
 MUMPS
 Caché ObjectScript
JOSS also inspired features for several versions of BASIC, including Tymshare's SUPER BASIC and DEC's BASIC-PLUS.

Lisp based
 Lisp
 Arc
 AutoLISP
 Clojure
 Common Lisp
 Emacs Lisp
 ISLISP
 Julia (has Lisp-like macros, but ALGOL-like syntax) (also under Python, Ruby, ALGOL)
 K (also under APL)
 LFE
 Logo
 Turtle graphics
 Nu programming language
 PicoLisp
 REBOL
 Red (programming language)
 RPL (also under Forth)
 S
 R
 PCASTL (also under ALGOL)
 Scheme
 GNU Guile
 Racket
 Hop
 Pico
 T
 Lua (also under Modula and SNOBOL)
 Ring (also under C, BASIC, Ruby, Python, C#)
JavaScript (also based on Self)
ECMAScript (also based on Self)

ML based
 ML
 Standard ML (SML)
 Caml
 OCaml
 F#
 Reason
 Rust (also under C++, Cyclone, and Haskell)

PL/I based
 PL/I
 PL/M
 PL/C
 REXX
 SP/k
 XPL

Prolog based
 Prolog
 CLP(R), CLP(FD)
 Mercury
 Erlang
 Cuneiform
 Elixir (also under Ruby)
 Logtalk

SASL based
 SASL
 Kent Recursive Calculator
 Miranda
 Haskell
 Agda
 Elm
 Idris
 Rust (also under C++, Cyclone, and OCaml)
 Swift (also under Ruby, Python, and Objective-C)
 PureScript

SETL based
 SETL
 ABC
 Python (also under C)
 Swift (also under Ruby, Objective-C, and Haskell)
 Boo
 Cobra (syntax and features)
Nim (also under Oberon)

sh based
 Sh
 bash
 csh (also under C)
 tcsh
 Hamilton C shell
 fish
 zsh
 ksh
 Windows PowerShell (also under C#, DCL, and Perl)
 Qshell

Simula based
 Simula (also under ALGOL 60)
 C++ (also under C)
 Smalltalk
 Objective-C (hybrid of C and Smalltalk)
 Swift (also under Ruby, Python, and Haskell)
 Cobra (support both dynamic and static types)
 Ruby (also under Perl)
 Swift (also under Objective-C, Python, and Haskell)
Elixir (also under Erlang)
 Self
 JavaScript (also under Scheme) (see also JavaScript based languages)
 NewtonScript
 Io
 BETA

Tcl based
 Tcl
 Expect
 Tea

Others
 Assembly
 BLISS
 CORAL
 Curl
 GPSS
 LabVIEW
 NXT-G
 Microsoft Power Fx
 occam
 POP-2, POP-11
 REFAL
 RPG (Report Program Generator)
 Seed7
 SQL (Structured Query Language)
 TACL (Tandem Advanced Command Language)
 TUTOR

References

External links

 Diagram & history of programming languages

Lists of programming languages